The Frontier Middle School shooting was a school shooting that occurred on February 2, 1996, at Frontier Middle School in Moses Lake, Washington, United States. The gunman, 14-year-old Barry Dale Loukaitis (born February 26, 1981), killed his algebra teacher and two students, and held his classmates hostage before a gym coach subdued him.

Shooting

On the day of the shooting, Loukaitis was dressed as a Wild West-style gunslinger and was wearing a black duster. He was armed with a .30–30 caliber hunting rifle and two handguns (one a .22 caliber revolver) that belonged to his father.

Loukaitis walked from his house to his school, where he had entered his algebra classroom during fifth period. He opened fire at students, killing two, Arnold Fritz and Manuel Vela, Jr., both fourteen. Another student, 13-year-old Natalie Hintz, sustained critical gunshot wounds to the right arm and abdomen, and was airlifted to Harborview Medical Center in Seattle.

Loukaitis then fatally shot his algebra teacher Leona Caires in the chest. Teacher and coach Jon Lane entered the classroom upon hearing the gunshots to find Loukaitis holding his classmates hostage. He planned to use one hostage so he could safely exit the school. Lane volunteered as the hostage, and Loukaitis kept him at gunpoint with his rifle. Lane then grabbed the weapon from Loukaitis and wrestled him to the ground, later assisting in the evacuation of students. Lane kept Loukaitis subdued until police arrived at the scene.

Perpetrator and motives
In the year prior to the shooting, the Loukaitis family was in a dysfunctional state dealing with multiple issues. Loukaitis' parents separated in 1995, after his mother discovered her husband was having an affair. She filed for divorce against her husband in January 1996. His mother, Jo Ann Phillips, was a domineering woman who became increasingly distant and began speaking of suicide. She would frequently imply that her son Barry would also have to kill himself, and that the date of the double-suicide would be on Valentine's Day of 1996. Barry talked his mother out of doing so, by having her write down her feelings.

Mental illness 
Psychologists hired by the defense believed Loukaitis had either depression or bipolar disorder, while prosecution witness Dr.Alan Unis, a professor of psychiatry and behavioral sciences at the University of Washington, diagnosed him with dysthymic disorder. Unis claimed Loukaitis could not have bipolar disorder because his personality was not fully developed at the time of the shooting.  Loukaitis had hyperactivity, and was taking Ritalin at the time of the shooting. He also had clinical depression, a mental illness present in the last three generations of the Loukaitis family, and last four generations of the Phillips family.

Loukaitis claimed that he was only intent on killing Manuel Vela, and that the other deaths were accidental.

Trial
In June 1996, the Spokane Court of Appeals were to decide whether 15-year-old Barry Loukaitis should be tried as an adult or as a juvenile. On July2, three members of the Spokane Court of Appeals convinced Judge Evan Sperline to allow court-appointed psychiatrist Joan Petrich to present testimony regarding Loukaitis' mental health. The trial was later moved to Seattle, Washington due to media publicity. Loukaitis had pleaded insanity on all charges against him, and claimed that "mood swings" were the cause of his violent actions. During his trial, Joan Petrich testified that Loukaitis had been experiencing delusional and messianic thoughts before the shooting. He had stated, "He felt like he was God and would laugh to himself. He felt he was superior to other people, and then those feelings were later replaced by hate, disdain, and not measuring up."

Prosecutors Donna Wise and John Knodell argued that Loukaitis had carefully planned the shooting, getting ideas from the Pearl Jam song "Jeremy". The music video from "Jeremy" shows a troubled youth committing suicide in front of his teacher and classmates, although it was largely believed that "Jeremy" had opened fire on the class. This has been widely misunderstood because MTV had strong anti-violence imagery rules. The original video showed the child putting the gun into his mouth, however the only images allowed to air were those of the children covered in his blood. Prosecution also said that he had gotten ideas from the Stephen King novel Rage and the films Natural Born Killers and The Basketball Diaries. Loukaitis has also stated that he tried to model his life after the novel Rages protagonist Charlie Decker, who kills two teachers and takes his algebra class hostage.

On September 24, 1997, Loukaitis was convicted of two counts of first-degree murder, one count of second-degree murder, one count of first-degree attempted murder, and 16 counts of aggravated kidnapping. He was sentenced to serve two life sentences and an additional 205 years without the possibility of parole. He is currently imprisoned at the Clallam Bay Corrections Center in Washington State. The Washington State Court of Appeals denied Loukaitis' request for a new trial in 1999.

Re-sentencing 
The U.S. Supreme Court ruled in 2012 that people convicted of murder, which they committed when they were under 18 years of age, could not receive automatic life terms without parole and in 2016, the court ruled that the policy would also be applied retroactively. Loukaitis was heard for a re-sentencing in 2017, during which he apologized for the first time, in a letter to the Grant County Superior Court. He was resentenced to 189 years in prison.

See also 
List of school shootings in the United States (before 2000)
List of school-related attacks

References

External links
On the Other Foot: groundhogs, bullies, lawyers and children
Teenage Rage
Movies Made Me Murder, Crime Library article on the shooting
Moses Lake Asks: "What Has This Town Become?" The Seattle Times, Sunday, February 23, 1997
Loukaitis gets two life terms plus 205 years
In Moses Lake, Guns avoid blame, The Seattle Times, Sunday, January 16, 2000
Teenager Recounts Shooting Rampage -- Four Jurors Replaced For Variety Of Reasons, The Seattle Times, Tuesday, August 26, 1997
Article on the shooting

1996 murders in the United States
1996 mass shootings in the United States
Mass shootings in the United States
Attacks in the United States in 1996
Hostage taking in the United States
School shootings committed by pupils
School killings in the United States
Grant County, Washington
Murder in Washington (state)
Middle school shootings in the United States
Deaths by firearm in Washington (state)
Crimes in Washington (state)
1996 in Washington (state)
February 1996 events in the United States
Mass shootings in Washington (state)